MedCath Corporation was an American cardiac health care company, publicly traded on the NASDAQ.  The company was founded in 1988 as MedCath Partners, a for-profit corporation which offered cath lab, nuclear cardiology, and sleep medicine services.  By 1998, the firm was known as Medcath, Inc.  In 1994, the company began opening and operating acute care cardiac hospitals.

In the early months of 2005, MedCath significantly shifted its corporate strategy. Instead of building cardiac hospitals and seeking physicians to invest in them, MedCath began partnering with existing hospitals or health care systems to expand existing cardiac care units or build new cardiac care units in existing hospitals. The strategy proved highly popular with stockholders, and the company stock price rose to $31.80 in September 2006 from a low of $14 a share in May 2006. Industry observers credited the shift in strategy to the company's chief executive officer, O. Edwin French, who took over leadership of MedCath in February 2006 (he'd previously been president of the acute care hospital division of Universal Health Services). French hired Phil Mazzuca (formerly with Iasis Healthcare) as chief operating officer.

On May 5, 2011, in a deal worth $25 million, MedCath sold most of its assets to a joint venture of LifePoint Hospitals and Duke University Health System.

In September 2012, facing a lawsuit, MedCath dissolved the company.

References

Health care companies based in North Carolina
Hospital networks in the United States
American companies established in 1988
1988 establishments in North Carolina